The 1980–81 Alpha Ethniki was the 45th season of the highest football league of Greece. The season began on 7 September 1980 and ended on 14 June 1981. Olympiacos won their second consecutive and 22nd Greek title.

The point system was: Win: 2 points - Draw: 1 point.

League table

Results

Top scorers

External links
Greek Wikipedia
Official Greek FA Site
Greek SuperLeague official Site
SuperLeague Statistics

Alpha Ethniki seasons
Greece
1